Jakob Norz (20 October 1920 – 16 September 1944) was a Luftwaffe flying ace of World War II. Norz is listed with 117 aerial victories—that is, 117 aerial combat encounters resulting in the destruction of the enemy aircraft—becoming an "ace-in-a-day" on seven separate occasions. All his victories were claimed over the Soviet Air Forces in 332 combat missions. He was also a recipient of the Knight's Cross of the Iron Cross, the highest award in the military and paramilitary forces of Nazi Germany during World War II. Norz was killed on 16 September 1944 in a forced landing following combat with a large formation of Soviet aircraft attacking Kirkenes.

Career
Norz was born on 20 October 1920 in Saulgrub in Free State of Bavaria within the Weimar Republic. Holding the rank of Unteroffizier (non-commissioned officer) he served with the I. Gruppe (1st group) of Nachtjagdgeschwader 2 (NJG 2—2nd Night Fighter Wing) since late 1941. With this unit he flew night fighter missions against England and convoy escort missions over the Mediterranean Sea. He was briefly transferred as a day time fighter pilot to Jagdgeschwader 51 (JG 51—51st Fighter Wing) operating on the Eastern Front in early 1942. Shortly afterwards, he was posted to the 11. Staffel (11th squadron) of Jagdgeschwader 1 (JG 1—1st Fighter Wing) which was located in Norway. On 21 March, the squadron was re-designated 8. Staffel of Jagdgeschwader 5 (JG 5—5th Fighter Wing). On 20 April, 8. Staffel moved to an airfield at Petsamo, present-day Pechenga in Murmansk Oblast, Russia on the Eismeerfront (Ice Sea Front)—the area of operations nearest the Arctic Ocean.

War on the Arctic Front
Operating in this northern theatre of operations, Norz claimed his first five aerial victories by the end of 1942. He was presented with the Iron Cross 1st Class by Generaloberst Hans-Jürgen Stumpff on account of his II. and III. Gruppe visit at Pechenga on 19 June.

Following victorious combat with two Ilyushin Il-2 "Shturmovik" southwest  Eyna Guba on 5 March 1943 he made a forced landing of his Messerschmitt Bf 109 F-4 (Werknummer  13108—factory number) on a frozen lake in no man's land. He returned to a German held position after an eight-hour walk in high snow. Norz claimed his 17th and 18th aerial victory on 4 June 1943. 

JG 5 flew multiple missions from Pechenga and Kirkenes in protection of a German convoy on 14 September. At 17:03, a Rotte of Bf 109 G-2s sighted and reported an enemy formation consisting of Douglas A-20 Havoc, also known as Boston bombers, Ilyushin Il-2 ground attack aircraft, as well as Bell P-39 Airacobra and Hawker Hurricane fighters. At 18:15, 9. Staffel was scrambled at Pechenga and 5. Staffel at Svartnes. A bit later further Bf 109s from 4., 7. and 5. Staffel took off. The Germans intercepted the Soviet formation east of Ekkerøy over the Varangerfjord. In this aerial engagement, Norz claimed the destruction of Hurricane fighter.

On 25 November, following ten days of relative quiet, the Soviet Air Forces conducted a coordinated attack on Titovka, and the airfields Høybuktmoen at Kirkenes and Luostari near Pechenga. Titovka is attacked by sixteen Il-2s and six Curtiss P-40 Warhawk, escorted by six Yakovlev Yak-1 and four Yakovlev Yak-9. Høybuktmoen was hit by twelve Petlyakov Pe-2 escorted by twelve Bell P-39 Airacobra and six Yak-9. The Luostari airfield was struck by sixteen Il-2 and six P-40, protected by fourteen Yak-1 and six Hurricanes. That day, Norz claimed two Il-2 ground attack aircraft, taking his total to 45 aerial victories.

On 17 March 1944, Norz became an "ace-in-a-day" for the first time, claiming five Soviet fighters shot down. He was awarded the Knight's Cross of the Iron Cross on 26 March 1944 following his 74th aerial victory. During aerial combat on 4 July, he claimed five Yakovlev Yak-9 fighters shot down, taking his total to 91. On 17 July, he became the 82nd Luftwaffe pilot to achieve the century mark. As part of the group expansion from three Staffeln per Gruppe to four Staffeln per Gruppe, Norz's 8. Staffel was re-designated and became the 11. Staffel of JG 5 on 15 August. Norz claimed four Petlyakov Pe-2 bombers and a Bell P-39 Airacobra destroyed on 23 August, taking his total to 116 aerial victories.

Walter Schuck, a wartime friend of Jakob Norz, witnessed Norz's final flight on 16 September 1944. According to Schuck, Norz attacked and shot down a Douglas Boston but was hit in the engine by the defensive fire from the Boston. Norz reported that his cabin was filling with smoke. Schuck urged Norz to bale out but Norz decided to fly back to base to avoid capture by the Russians. Schuck broke off further combat and escorted Norz back to base. Norz, intoxicated by the smoke, reported that his elevator seized and that he could not trim the aircraft. Already too low for bailing out, Norz attempted a crash landing in the tundra. The Bf 109 G-6 "yellow 8" (Werknummer 412 199—factory number) struck a rock and disintegrated, killing Norz. He was buried with military honors at the German war cemetery at Pechenga.

Summary of career

Aerial victory claims
According to US historian David T. Zabecki, Norz was credited with 117 aerial victories. Obermaier and Spick also list Norz with 117 aerial victories claimed in 332 combat missions, all of which claimed on the Eastern Front. Mathews and Foreman, authors of Luftwaffe Aces — Biographies and Victory Claims, researched the German Federal Archives and found records for 104 aerial victory claims, all of which claimed on the Eastern Front.

Victory claims were logged to a map-reference (PQ = Planquadrat), for example "PQ 36 Ost 3079". These sectors were then subdivided into 36 smaller units to give a location area 3 × 4 km in size.

Awards
 Iron Cross (1939) 2nd and 1st Class
 Honour Goblet of the Luftwaffe on 13 September 1943 as Feldwebel and pilot
 German Cross in Gold on 17 October 1943 as Feldwebel in the 8./Jagdgeschwader 5
 Knight's Cross of the Iron Cross on 26 March 1944 as Oberfeldwebel and pilot in the 6./Jagdgeschwader 5

Notes

References

Citations

Bibliography

External links

1920 births
1944 deaths
Luftwaffe pilots
German World War II flying aces
Luftwaffe personnel killed in World War II
Recipients of the Gold German Cross
Recipients of the Knight's Cross of the Iron Cross
Military personnel from Bavaria
People from Garmisch-Partenkirchen (district)
Victims of aviation accidents or incidents in Norway